The 2009 FA Trophy Final was the 39th final of The Football Association's cup competition for levels 5–8 of the English football league system. It was contested by Stevenage Borough, who won the competition in 2007, and York City on 9 May 2009 at Wembley Stadium in London.

Stevenage won the match 2–0 to win the competition for the second time in their history.

Match

Details

References

External links

FA Trophy Finals
Fa Trophy Final
May 2009 sports events in the United Kingdom
Fa Trophy Final
Fa Trophy Final 2009
Fa Trophy Final 2009
Events at Wembley Stadium